Chrisma may refer to:
Chrism, a consecrated oil used in many Christian denominations
Krisma, originally known as Chrisma, an Italian new wave/electronic music duo

See also
Chrismon (disambiguation)